Entergy Tower (also known as One Poydras Plaza), located at 639 Loyola Avenue in the Central Business District of New Orleans, Louisiana, is a 28-story, -tall skyscraper.

The building used to have the Consulate-General of Japan in New Orleans.  In 2006, the Japanese Government announced that it was moving the consulate to Nashville, Tennessee. The diplomatic mission was relocated to be closer to industries and operations owned by Japanese companies.

See also

List of tallest buildings in New Orleans

References

Skyscraper office buildings in New Orleans
Buildings and structures completed in 1983
Entergy
1983 establishments in Louisiana